Chris Hollow (born 21 November 1971) is a former Australian rules footballer who played with St Kilda in the Australian Football League (AFL).

Hollow was selected by St Kilda with pick 46 in the 1993 Pre-season Draft, from Dandenong. He played 24 league games for St Kilda, over the course of three seasons.

Following his AFL career, Hollow went on to write for the television show “Neighbours”, perform in the band Sand Pebbles, and currently produces the breakfast show on ABC Radio Melbourne.

References

External links
 
 

1971 births
Australian rules footballers from Victoria (Australia)
St Kilda Football Club players
Dandenong Football Club players
Living people